Paulina Trotz (June 30, 1986) is an Argentine Biologist and Model.

Biography 
Paulina Trotz was born on June 30, 1986. She is the second daughter of Ernesto Trotz and María Laura Fernández Roussee, one of the Trix.

Personal life 
On August 5, 2012 she married the retired Argentine rugby union player, Gonzalo Tiesi. On May 26, 2014, she gave birth to the couple's first child, a boy, whom they called Gonzalo Ignacio Tiesi.  On December 15, 2015, she gave birth to the couple's second child, a boy, whom they called Carlos Emilio Tiesi. On October 14, 2020, she gave birth to the couple's third child, a boy, whom they called Borja Tiesi. On March, 2022, her mother announced that they were expecting their fourth child.

See also
List of Argentines

References

Argentine female models
Living people
1985 births
Argentine people of German descent